Surovatikha is the name of several rural localities in Surovatikhinsky Selsoviet of Dalnekonstantinovsky District of Nizhny Novgorod Oblast, Russia:
Surovatikha (selo), a selo
Surovatikha (station settlement), a station settlement